Julien Viale (born 13 February 1982 in Lyon) is a French football striker.

Honours
 Ligue 1: 2003–04
 Trophée des Champions: 2003, 2004

References

External links
 
 
 

1982 births
Living people
French footballers
Olympique Lyonnais players
Stade de Reims players
FC Istres players
Stade Brestois 29 players
AC Ajaccio players
Stade Lavallois players
AJ Auxerre players
Ligue 1 players
Ligue 2 players
Footballers from Lyon
Association football forwards